Isabela Garcia Costa (born 11 June 1967) is a Brazilian actress. In her youth, she was called the Brazilian "Shirley Temple".

Biography 

In Isabela made several theater performances, including Cantares em desafino (1983), Léo e Bia (1984), No coração do Brasil (1993), Luxúria, Soberba e Ira (1998), A dança dos mitos (1999), AHH com Os Melhores do Mundo (1999), Laboratório de Humor (2000), Alarmes (2001), Terceiras Intenções (2003) and Cruzes! Festa Surpresa! (2006). In 2010 he participated in the Christmas show at HSBC, in Curitiba.

In 2004, Isabela produced the show Beijo na boca, Carlos Thiré, her former husband. In 2009, he was in soap opera Cama de Gato.

In January 2018, the actress announced her departure from TV Globo, after 46 years on the station. Returning in the same year, being cast to the cast of the novel O Sétimo Guardião. Being your first contract work at work.

Personal life 
Isabela is the daughter of Dirce Prieto and of the radioator Gilberto Garcia, who died in 1996. She has two brothers and one sister Gilberto, Ricardo and Rosana Garcia, actress, performer of the famous Narizinho of Sítio do Picapau Amarelo.

She has four children: João Pedro Bonfá, Gabriella Garcia Wanderley and twins Francisco and Bernardo Thiré.

Isabela has a granddaughter, Luisa, born in 2011.

Isabela is a convert to Buddhism.

Filmography

Television

Films 
 1976 - Ninguém Segura Essas Mulheres .... Patrícia
 1988 - Jardim de Alah	
 1998 - Como Ser Solteiro .... Picnic Woman
 2004 - Home on the Range .... Grace (Brazilian voice dubbing)
 2006 - O Amigo Invisível
 2015 - Adelaida .... Sofia (short film)
 2016 - Minha Fama de Mau - O Filme .... Diva
 2022 - Atypical Lovers .... Caroline de Souza (Carol)

References

External links 

1967 births
Living people
Actresses from Rio de Janeiro (city)
Brazilian telenovela actresses
Brazilian film actresses
Brazilian stage actresses
Brazilian Buddhists
Converts to Buddhism